The 2018 Barking and Dagenham Council election took place on 3 May 2018 to elect members of Barking and Dagenham Council in London. This was on the same day as other local elections. The Labour Party won every available council seat for the third election in a row, winning 74% of the popular vote. The Conservatives saw their vote share rise by 13 percentage points, but failed to win any seats.

Background
At the last election in May 2014, Labour won 52% of the vote share, and all 51 seats, but due to defections were reduced to 49 seats. Both Labour and the Conservatives stood candidates in all 17 wards, contesting all 51 seats. The BNP and the Greens were the only two other parties to field candidates, two and one respectively. An independent candidate also stood in Eastbrook. Despite gaining over 26% of the vote and coming second in all wards except Longbridge at the previous election, UKIP did not field any candidates.

Election results

Ward results

Abbey 

Cllr Butt was suspended by the Labour Party two weeks after the election, but was reinstated after apologising for not declaring an interest in two properties whilst she was responsible for punishing rogue landlords.

Alibon

Becontree

Chadwell Heath

Eastbrook

Eastbury

Gascoigne

Goresbrook

Heath

Longbridge

On 24 May 2019 Cllr Gill was suspended from the Labour Party after social media posts indicated he supported The Brexit Party in the 2019 European Elections. He was later reinstated.

Mayesbrook

Parsloes

River

Thames

Valence

Village

Whalebone

By-elections between 2018 and 2022

Thames

The by-election was called following the resignation of Councillor Bill Turner.

References

2018
2018 London Borough council elections